Gonks are novelty toys and collectibles originating from the United Kingdom in the 1960s.

Created by English inventor Robert Benson, the toys gained popularity and were owned by celebrities including Ringo Starr and Peter Sellers. The Gonks' signature features include a small, spherical body, a furry texture and two googly eyes. Some Gonks had outfits such as those of Merseybeat rockers and were marketed as collectibles. They were popular with children and their success was attributed to how they "can be made from almost any material and of any size." The appearance of some of these toys has been compared to the op art movement.

Redesigned (cyclinders rather than spheres) gonks were introduced into Australia by Tony Bell in the 1970s. They were sold in skill testers and fairgrounds across New South Wales and Queensland.

History
Londoner Robert Benson invented the original toys that achieved popularity in the United Kingdom in the 1960s. The sale of the toys expanded to nations such as Canada and the United States, where Gund began to sell Gonks at a large scale, including inflatable vinyl versions.

Gonks are featured in the title sequence of Gonks Go Beat, a 1965 science-fiction film created by exploitation film director Robert Hartford-Davis. The film features a Romeo and Juliet-style love story with celebrity appearances by Ginger Baker and Lulu.

See also
 Gonks Go Beat
 Troll doll
 Weepul

References

External links
 
 

Stuffed toys
1960s toys
1970s toys